State Route 200 (SR 200) is a  state highway that runs west-to-east through portions of Early and Baker counties in the southwestern part of the U.S. state of Georgia. Its western terminus is in Blakely, and its eastern terminus is in Newton.

Route description
SR 200 begins at an intersection with SR 62 (Magnolia Street) in Blakely. It heads southeast to an intersection with US 27/SR 1. The road heads east, curves to the southeast, and curves again to the east, until it enters Damascus. There, it has a brief concurrency with SR 45 (Brumby Avenue). SR 200 continues to the east and crosses into Baker County. It then resumes its eastern and southeastern routing for most of the remainder of its length. It curves to the northeast, and has one last curve to the east, before it reaches the Newton area. Immediately prior to the city limits is an intersection with SR 37. A little less than  later, it meets its eastern terminus, an intersection with SR 91 in Newton.

SR 200 is not part of the National Highway System, a system of roadways important to the nation's economy, defense, and mobility.

Major intersections

See also

References

External links

 Georgia Roads (Routes 181 - 200)

200
Transportation in Early County, Georgia
Transportation in Baker County, Georgia